Jefri Bolkiah ibni Omar Ali Saifuddien III (born 6 November 1954), is a member of the Brunei Royal Family. His elder brother is the Sultan of Brunei, Hassanal Bolkiah. Prince Jefri was the finance minister of his oil-rich country from 1986 to 1997. He also served as chairman of the Brunei Investment Agency (BIA) which invests much of the country's wealth and was responsible for overseas investments. 

In the wake of the 1997 Asian financial crisis, the sultan had external accountants audit the books of BIA, resulting in charges by the Brunei government that Prince Jefri had embezzled $14.8 billion. He denies the charges but in 2000 agreed to hand over his personal holdings to the government, in return for avoiding criminal prosecution and being allowed to keep a personal residence in Brunei. After numerous legal disputes and appeals, in 2007 Britain's Privy Council ruled that this agreement is enforceable. Prince Jefri is known for his extravagant lifestyle. His personal holdings included a huge art collection, the British jeweller Asprey, the New York Palace Hotel, Hotel Bel-Air in Los Angeles and Plaza Athénée in Paris. He has been married 6 times and divorced 4 wives  and has nineteen children.

Personal life
He has had five wives, four of whom he is divorced from and 1 to whom he is still married, and eighteen children aged between around 4 to 37 in 2008. Additionally he has faced a number of accusations, including lawsuits from the women allegedly involved, that he has paid women to go to Brunei to have sex with him (see ); it is alleged he kept a harem of up to 25
women for several years, which included the writer Jillian Lauren, who published Some Girls: My Life in a Harem about her experiences., 

His costly possessions included a private Boeing 747, a large art collection including works by Manet, Renoir and at least twenty-one works by Degas, along with a collection of 2,000 luxury cars including specially commissioned unique Aston Martins, a number of properties including the Plaza Athénée hotel in Paris and Hotel Bel-Air in Los Angeles, the New York Palace Hotel in Manhattan, and others in Paris, Las Vegas and St John's Lodge, in Regent's Park, London, businesses such as the luxury goods manufacturer Asprey, and a yacht named Tits (which came with tenders named Nipple 1 and Nipple 2). His assets were estimated at $1.5 billion. By the 2000s, due to his legal issues (see below) he was forced to sell many of his assets and be exiled from Brunei, although as of September 2009 he appears to have been allowed to return to Brunei and has been seen in public with the Royal Family.

Legal issues with Brunei
Prince Jefri has had a number of legal issues with the state of Brunei, which have amounted to the most costly legal battle in the world.

Brunei is a gas and oil rich state ruled by the Sultan in a constitutional sultanate; the Sultan has control over every aspect of life in Brunei. The Sultan was, at one time, the richest man in the world. From 20 October 1986 to 23 February 1997 Prince Jefri was the Minister of Finance for Brunei, responsible for dealing with revenue from oil and gas through the state body Brunei Investment Agency (BIA), of which Prince Jefri was chairman.

Prince Jefri also owned a network of companies and investment vehicles under the name Amadeo run by his son Hakim, which was used to buy the luxury goods company Asprey and build an amusement park and other projects in Brunei. In July 1998 the Amadeo group collapsed under US$10 billion in debt. Between 1983 and mid-1998 some US$40 billion of what were called "special transfers" were made from the accounts of the BIA.

An independent investigation was undertaken into the circumstances of these special transfers, concluding that in round figures, US$14.8 billion were paid to the accounts of Prince Jefri, US$8 billion to accounts of the Sultan and US$3.8 billion for Government purposes; the destination, purpose and recipients of the remaining transfers were not established. Due to the secretive nature of the state and the blurred lines as to where the royal family’s finances and the state finances began and ended, establishing the true course of events is very difficult.

Prince Jefri was accused of misappropriating state funds to pay for his own personal investments, bought through BIA and Amedeo companies and removed from his position as head of BIA.

In February 2000, the Bruneian government attempted to obtain a freezing order on Prince Jefri’s overseas assets, which led to him countersuing in New York. Following protracted negotiations a settlement agreement was signed by the Prince in May 2000, the terms of which were never made public. However, Prince Jefri claimed assurances were made to him by the Sultan with regards to keeping certain properties to maintain his lifestyle, which BIA denied.

In accordance with the settlement agreement signed in 2000, the prince began to return his assets to the state, including more than 500 properties, both in Brunei and abroad, more than 2,000 cars, 100 paintings, five boats, and nine aircraft. In 2001, ten thousand lots of Prince Jefri’s possessions went to auction.

However, the BIA alleged that the Prince failed to uphold the agreement by failing to disclose all his accounts, and allowing money to be taken from frozen accounts, and restarted legal proceedings to gain full control of the Prince’s assets. After a number of appeals, this finally reached the Privy Council in London, which can serve as Brunei's highest court of appeal as a result of Brunei's former protectorate status.

The Privy Council rejected Prince Jefri's evidence, describing his contention that the agreement allowed for him to retain a number of properties as "simply incredible", and ruled in favour of the Government of Brunei and the BIA; consequently the Prince's appeal was dismissed and he was ordered to return the rest of his assets to Brunei.

The decision of the Privy Council did not end the litigation between Prince Jefri and the BIA. The BIA re-opened proceedings in Malaysia and the Cayman Islands, resulting in the BIA gaining control over the Hotel Bel-Air in Los Angeles and The New York Palace Hotel in Manhattan.

The BIA also re-opened collateral litigation in the British High Court. After winning before the Privy Council, the BIA asked the court to determine whether Prince Jefri should be held in contempt of court for allegedly making misstatements in his listing of assets. The contempt proceeding was scheduled for a hearing in June 2008, but the Prince did not attend, instead going to Paris. Judge Peter Smith did not rule on whether Prince Jefri was in contempt, but did issue a warrant for his arrest. As of November 2010, the warrant still appears to be in place, meaning the Prince will be arrested if he enters the UK.

Other legal issues
In 1997 Shannon Marketic, a former Miss USA, accused Prince Jefri and the Sultan, among others, of flying her and many other women to Brunei under false pretenses to be part of a harem, and that she was abused by those in the royal court. The case was raised in a US court, but it was later dropped, because Jefri was held to have diplomatic immunity.

In February 1998 Prince Jefri was sued by his former business partners Bob and Rafi Manoukian for £80 million over two property deals they claim he reneged upon; the Manoukians claimed he flew in prostitutes from around the world and led a wildly extravagant lifestyle. The Prince countersued, then settled out of court.

In 2006, the Prince began legal proceedings against his former advisors, the barrister Thomas Derbyshire and his wife Faith Zaman, in both the UK and US, accusing them of stealing funds from him. The pair had worked for Prince Jefri since 2004, were given authority over a number of the Prince's companies, and were accused of using proceeds from property sales for their own benefit and charging personal expenses to corporate credit cards. However, they contended no money was taken and all the contested purchases were for the use of the Prince and his family, and counter-sued for US$12 million they claim they were owed. The case is estimated to have cost Brunei US$60 million to litigate despite the value of the court case being US$7 million and Prince Jefri being a key witness for the State of Brunei, which has repeatedly taken him to court, challenging his compliance with court orders and questioning his veracity.

In November 2010, pictures of statues the Prince had made of him and his fiancée, Micha Raines, having sex were leaked. Various details, such as previous challenges by BIA to Prince Jefri's credibility, the wealth of Prince Jefri, the Sultan and the state of Brunei, his multiple wives, the statues and the still-in-effect British warrant for the Prince's arrest were banned from being mentioned in the courtroom as Judge Ira Gammerman ruled they were irrelevant to the case. After nearly six weeks of trial, the jury returned a unanimous verdict against the Prince on all but one count. The Prince and the New York Palace Hotel were ordered to pay the Derbyshires US$21 million in total. Brunei has stated it intends to appeal.

Issue

Personal life
His first wife, Pengiran Anak Isteri Pengiran Norhayati, is a member the Brunei Royal Family as the daughter YAM Pengiran Jaya Negara Pengiran Haji Abdul Rahman, by the wife, Y.M Pengiran Siti Marwadi binti Pengiran Anak Ahmad.The Pengiran Anak Isteri Pengiran Norhayati is a descendant of the eleventh Sultan of Brunei, Sultan Abdul Jalilul Jabbar and the 18th Sultan of Brunei, Sultan Omar Ali Saifuddin I. Together they have 3 children and 4 grandchildren.

Ancestry
{{ahnentafel
|collapsed=yes |align=center
|boxstyle_1=background-color: #fcc;
|boxstyle_2=background-color: #fb9;
|boxstyle_3=background-color: #ffc;
|boxstyle_4=background-color: #bfc;
|1= 1. 'Pengiran Anak Isteri Pengiran Norhayati |2= 2. Pengiran Jaya Negara Pengiran Haji Abdul Rahman
|3= 3. Pengiran Siti Marwadi
|4= 4. Y.M. Pangiran Haji ‘Abdu’l Rahim
|5= 5. Y.M. Pangiran Anak Tengah Nor Salam
|6= 6. Y.M Pengiran Anak Ahmad 
|8= 8. Y.A.M. Pangiran Maharaja Laila Sahibul-Kahar Pangiran Anak ‘Abdu’l Kahar 
|9= 9. Y.M. Dayang Siti Mariam binti Awang Muhammad Aqil 
|10= 10. Y.M Pengiran Anak Bujang Damit 
|16= 16.Y.A.M. Pangiran Kerma Indira Pangiran Anak Bahar 
|17= 17. Y.M. Pangiran Anak Zakiah binti Y.A.M. Pangiran Indira Mahkota Pangiran Jamaluddin bin Pangiran Tua Hassan
|18= 18.Awang Muhammad Aqil bin Pehin Orang Kaya Sang Sura Awang Maun
}}

 Legacy 

 Title 
He carries the title: 

 Namesakes 

 Jefri Bolkiah Mosque, a mosque opened in Kampong Batong on 26 July 2013.
 IBTE Jefri Bolkiah Campus, a post-secondary vocational institute in Kuala Belait.

 Honours 

He has been awarded :

 National 
  Order of the Crown of Brunei (DKMB)
  Order of Laila Utama (DK I) – Dato Laila Utama (26 December 1970)
  Sultan Hassanal Bolkiah Medal (PHBS) – (1 August 1968)
 Sultan Golden Jubilee Medal (5 October 2017)
 Sultan Silver Jubilee Medal (5 October 1992)

 Foreign 
  :
  Order of the Defender of the Realm Grand Commander (SMN) – Tun (8 April 1989)
  Order of the Crown of Johor Knight Grand Commander (SPMJ) – Dato' 
  Order of Sultan Ahmad Shah of Pahang Grand Knight (SSAP) – Dato' Sri  Order of Cura Si Manja Kini Grand Knight (SPCM) – Dato' Seri  Order of Sultan Salahuddin Abdul Aziz Shah Knight Grand Companion (SSSA) – Dato' Seri  : 
 Order of Muhammad First Class
  : 
  Order of Abdulaziz Al Saud First Class (1990)
  : 
  Order of Nila Utama First Class (DUNU) – (12 February 1990)
  : 
  Grand Order of Mugunghwa
  Order of Diplomatic Service Merit First Grade
  : 
  Order of the White Elephant Knight Grand Cordon (MPCh (GCE))
  : 
  Royal Victorian Order Honorary Knight Grand Cross (GCVO) – Sir''' (3 November 1992)

Ancestry

References

1954 births
Living people
Bruneian royalty
Finance ministers of Brunei
Knights Grand Commander of the Order of the Crown of Johor
Recipients of the Darjah Utama Nila Utama
Honorary Knights Grand Cross of the Royal Victorian Order
People from Bandar Seri Begawan
Competitors at the 2019 Southeast Asian Games
Southeast Asian Games competitors for Brunei
Sons of monarchs